The Jaywick Miniature Railway was a narrow gauge railway running along the seafront of the Essex coastline, connecting Clacton on Sea to the recently-opened holiday resort of Jaywick. It opened in July 1936 and closed in September 1939 following the outbreak of World War II. After the war three coaches were sold to the New Brighton Miniature Railway. The latter closed in 1965, and the coaches were then transferred to the Ravenglass and Eskdale Railway.

References

Further reading
 

Rail transport in Essex
Closed railway lines in South East England
Railway lines opened in 1936
Railway lines closed in 1939